Love Affair is a 1994 American romantic drama film and a remake of the 1939 film of the same name. It was directed by Glenn Gordon Caron and produced by Warren Beatty from a screenplay by Robert Towne and Beatty, based on the 1939 screenplay by Delmer Daves and Donald Ogden Stewart, based on the story by Mildred Cram and Leo McCarey. The music score was by Ennio Morricone and the cinematography by Conrad L. Hall.

The film stars Beatty, Annette Bening and Katharine Hepburn in her final film role, with Garry Shandling, Chloe Webb, Pierce Brosnan, Kate Capshaw, Paul Mazursky and Brenda Vaccaro.

Plot
Ex-football star Mike Gambril and singer Terry McKay, each of whom is engaged to marry someone else, meet on a flight to Sydney. The plane makes an emergency landing and passengers must wait until a piece of equipment is delivered.

Mike and Terry visit his elderly aunt Ginny on the isle of Moorea. They see each other with new eyes and fall in love. When they reach New York City, they agree to reunite at the top of the Empire State Building in three months' time. Terry breaks up with her fiancé Ken Allen, as does Mike with his, Lynn Weaver.

Terry finds work as a singer, mostly in advertisements. Mike quits his job as a Los Angeles television sports announcer. He finds work as a coach at a small school and also returns to his true vocation as a painter. One of his pieces is of Terry in prayer from their idyllic day on the island.

Coming to their rendezvous, Terry, in her haste, is struck down by a car while crossing a street. Gravely injured, she is rushed to the hospital. Mike, waiting for her at the observation deck at the top of the building, is unaware of the accident. After many hours, he finally concedes at midnight that she has rejected him.

Now unable to walk, Terry refuses to contact Mike, wanting to conceal her disability. Instead, she finds a job as a music teacher. Six months after the accident, she sees Mike with his former fiancée at a holiday concert featuring Ray Charles, which Terry is attending with her former boyfriend. Mike does not notice her condition because she is seated. Each can only manage a hello.

Christmas Eve arrives and Mike makes a surprise visit, claiming to have come across her address while looking up another name in a telephone directory. Although he steers the conversation to make her explain her actions, Terry merely dodges the subject, never leaving the couch on which she sits.

About to leave her life for good, Mike mentions the painting that he had done of her, which that very afternoon had been given away to a woman who admired it. He is about to point out that the woman was in a wheelchair when he suddenly pauses. Mike walks into Terry's bedroom and sees his painting hanging on the wall. He now knows why she did not keep their appointment. They embrace.

Cast
 Warren Beatty ...  Mike Gambril
 Annette Bening ...  Terry McKay
 Katharine Hepburn ...  Ginny
 Garry Shandling ...  Kip DeMay
 Chloe Webb ...  Tina Wilson
 Pierce Brosnan ...  Ken Allen
 Kate Capshaw ...  Lynn Weaver
 Harold Ramis ...  Sheldon Blumenthal
 Carey Lowell ... Martha
 Ray Charles ...  Himself
 Linda Wallem ... Lorraine
 Cylk Cozart ... Dr. Punch
 Meagen Fay ... SSA Flight Attendant 
 Ray Girardin ... Wally Tripp 
 John Hostetter ... Ben 
 Elya Baskin ... Ship Captain  
 Savely Kramarov ... Cable Officer
 Oleg Vidov ... Russian Businessman 
 Herman Sinitzyn ... Russian Waiter
 Taylor Dayne ... Marissa
 Ryk O. aka Dick Ochampaugh ... Ship Steward, Russian Dancer

Background and production
The film is a remake of the 1939 film Love Affair with Charles Boyer and Irene Dunne and of the 1957 film  An Affair to Remember with Cary Grant and Deborah Kerr, both directed by Leo McCarey. The name of Terry McKay's character remained the same in all three films, while a different one was chosen for each of the three leading men.

Love Affair was Hepburn's first big-screen appearance in nearly 10 years (although she had made several TV movies in this time) and marked her last appearance in cinema. It includes the only time that she ever said the word "fuck" on-screen. Beatty personally lobbied 86-year-old Hepburn to appear in the film. He rented a house for her in Los Angeles and had her referred to a special dermatologist, but she did not give a definitive answer until the day of filming. Luise Rainer was also considered for the role.
 
Filming took place in New York City, Los Angeles and on the islands of Tahiti and Moorea in French Polynesia.

Reception
The remake was neither a critical nor a commercial success at the box office. It grossed $18 million domestically over a budget of $60 million and holds a 28% rating on Rotten Tomatoes from 29 reviews. Audiences surveyed by CinemaScore gave the film a grade "B+" on scale of A to F. The film was nominated for one Razzie Award, Worst Remake or Sequel.

Year-end lists 
 7th worst – Peter Travers, Rolling Stone
 7th worst – Janet Maslin, The New York Times

References

External links
 
 
 
 
 
 

1994 films
American romantic comedy-drama films
1990s romantic comedy-drama films
Remakes of American films
Empire State Building in fiction
Films set in New York City
Warner Bros. films
Films directed by Glenn Gordon Caron
Films scored by Ennio Morricone
Films with screenplays by Robert Towne
Films with screenplays by Warren Beatty
Films produced by Warren Beatty
Films set in French Polynesia
1994 comedy films
1994 drama films
1990s English-language films
1990s American films